You're Telling Me is a 1942 American comedy film directed by Charles Lamont and written by Frances Hyland and Brenda Weisberg. The film stars Hugh Herbert, Anne Gwynne, Robert Paige, Edward Ashley-Cooper, Ernest Truex and Esther Dale. It was released on May 3, 1942 by Universal Pictures.

Plot

Cast        
Hugh Herbert as Hubert Abercrombie Gumm
Anne Gwynne as Kit Bellamy
Robert Paige as Dr. Burnside 'Burnsy' Walker
Edward Ashley-Cooper as Fred Curtis
Ernest Truex as Charles Handley
Esther Dale as Aunt Fannie Handley
Eily Malyon as Mrs. Appleby
Charles Smith as Bill
Helen Lynd as Miss Ames
Romaine Callender as J.T. Dorsett
Boyd Davis as Driscoll
Vickie Lester as Mrs. Adalaide Parks 
Linda Brent as Leili

References

External links
 

1942 films
1930s English-language films
American comedy films
1942 comedy films
Universal Pictures films
Films directed by Charles Lamont
American black-and-white films